Théo Lacroix (born 2 October 1922) was a Belgian footballer. He played in one match for the Belgium national football team in 1949.

References

External links
 

1922 births
Possibly living people
Belgian footballers
Belgium international footballers
Place of birth missing (living people)
Association football midfielders